Samuel Tak Lee or Lee Tak-Yee (born April 1939) is a Hong Kong property billionaire.

Early life
Lee was born in April 1939.  He was educated at Diocesan Boys' School in Mong Kok, before earning bachelor's and master's degrees in civil and environmental engineering from the Massachusetts Institute of Technology in 1964. Lee then earned an MBA from Harvard Business School.

Career
After finishing his studies, Lee returned to Hong Kong to join Prudential Enterprise, the real estate company founded by his father and uncle in 1958.  He took control of the entire business from his brother Lee Tak-Yan in 1985. Prudential Enterprises owns the Prudential Hotel in Hong Kong and has significant holdings in Hong Kong, Japan, Switzerland and Singapore.  In the UK, he purchased the 14 acre Langham Estate in London's Fitzrovia district in 1994.   A real estate portfolio Lee indirectly established in Tokyo in 1999 was eventually sold in 2017 for approximately $1.2 billion.

By 2019 Lee had become the largest shareholder in Shaftesbury plc a large London real estate investment trust with a 26.3 per cent stake.  There was persistent media speculation that Lee would eventually bid for control of Shaftesbury.  The Times also reported that Lee was suing Shaftesbury for £10.4 million in alleged losses over a share placing.  His interest in Shaftesbury was subsequently sold at a discount to Capco for $544 million in June 2020.

Lee has been noted for his vigorous defence of his estate’s legal rights and business interests. According to Forbes, he had a net worth of $3.6 billion, as of January 2021.

Philanthropy
In 2007, Lee donated HK$9 million to Hong Kong's Diocesan Boys' School, of which he was a student between 1951 and 1958.  The donation was made to fund residential student growth with a new dormitory block for the school.  One of Lee's sons was studying at the school at that time.

Lee donated $118 million in 2015 to the Massachusetts Institute of Technology, to be used to establish a real estate entrepreneurship lab focused on China.  The lab has been researching the impact of poor urban air quality on residents' health, social lives and behaviour.

Personal life
Lee is married with seven children and lives between Hong Kong and London.  He reportedly owns the yachts Pelorus and Kogo. The Lee family reported owns a Boeing aircraft and a large car collection.

Lee maintains a low profile and rarely speaks out about his many business dealings.  According to media reports and court documents Lee has a colourful personal life.

Samuel's son, Samathur Li Kin-kan, is famous for his divorce settlement, which the court of Hong Kong awarded his ex-wife HK$1.2 billion.

Gallery

References

External links

1939 births
Living people
Hong Kong real estate businesspeople
Hong Kong billionaires
Harvard Business School alumni
MIT School of Engineering alumni
Hong Kong philanthropists